Technology for Autonomous Operational Survivability (also known as TAOS and STEP 0) was a satellite developed by the US Air Force's Phillips Laboratory (now part of the Air Force Research Laboratory Space Vehicles Directorate) to test technology for autonomous operation of spacecraft.

The TAOS mission was operated by heritage Space Test and Development Wing and the 1st Space Operations Squadron.

References 

Spacecraft launched in 1994
Satellites of the United States Air Force